The Bank of New Zealand Te Aro branch building is an historic building on the corner of Manners and Cuba Street, Wellington, New Zealand.

The building, designed by William Turnbull (son of Thomas Turnbull), is one of Wellington's earliest reinforced concrete and steel structures. It features Corinthian columns and ornate projecting cornice. It was refurbished in the early 1980s.

The building, classified as a "Category I" ("places of 'special or outstanding historical or cultural heritage significance or value'") historic place by the New Zealand Historic Places Trust, housed a Burger King restaurant until April 2020.

References

Buildings and structures in Wellington City
Heritage New Zealand Category 1 historic places in the Wellington Region
Bank of New Zealand
1910s architecture in New Zealand